Copper(II) tetrafluoroborate is any inorganic compound with the formula Cu(H2O)x(BF4)2. As usually encountered, it is assumed to be the hexahydrate (x = 6), but this salt can be partially dehydrated to the tetrahydrate.  Regardless, these compounds are aquo complexes of copper in its +2 oxidation state,  with two weakly coordinating tetrafluoroborate anions.

The compound is used in organic synthesis, e.g. as a Lewis acid for Diels Alder reactions, for cyclopropanation of alkenes with diazo reagents, and as a Lewis Acid in Meinwald Rearrangement reactions on Epoxides.  In the former two applications, the copper(II) is reduced to a copper(I) catalyst. The compound is also used for copper electroplating in fluoroborate-based plating baths.

References

Copper(II) compounds
Tetrafluoroborates